The Latymer School is a selective, mixed grammar school in Edmonton, London, England, established in 1624 by Edward Latymer. According to league tables, Latymer is one of the top state-funded schools in the country.

History and traditions 
Latymer was established in 1624 on Church Street, Edmonton by bequest of Edward Latymer, a London City merchant in Hammersmith. Although most of his wealth passed to the people of Hammersmith and the Parish of St Dunstan's (now Latymer Upper School), he named certain properties and estates to fund the education and livelihoods of "eight poore boies of Edmonton" with a doublet, a pair of breeches, a shirt, a pair of woollen stockings and shoes distributed biannually on Ascension Day and All Saints' Day. Pupils wore the red Latymer cross on their sleeves.

The school has formal links with St John's College, Cambridge (Edward Latymer's College) and Corpus Christi College, Cambridge (the College of Edward Latymer's father, William Latymer) which have endowments which may be used for the furtherance of the studies of former Latymer pupils at those colleges.

In 1662, John Wild of Edmonton made a bequest for the annual maintenance of a schoolmaster and a poor scholar at Cambridge. In 1697, Thomas Style extended the bequest to fund the education of "twenty poor boys ... Grammar and Latin tongue." Several similar benefactions produced about £550 per annum, which funded the instruction of more than one hundred boys, of which sixty were clothed. In 1811, Ann Wyatt, a widow from Hackney, willed her Navy Annuities for the construction and maintenance of a new school. The school-room was built in 1811 in accordance to her will.

The school did not take on Latymer's name for some centuries, when it finally did, it was known as Latymer's School. At some point, the apostrophe was dropped and the name modified to the Latymer School. It has been situated on its present site since 1910, when it also became coeducational. The school motto, Qui Patitur Vincit ('Who endures wins'), was also adopted in 1910 by Richard Ashworth, then headmaster. Prior to this, the motto was Palmam Qui Meruit Ferat ('Let he who bears the palm (of honour) deserve it').

In 1967 the school switched to a comprehensive intake as a result of Circular 10/65, a request from the Labour government to local education authorities to plan for conversion to a fully comprehensive education system. However, a certain amount of informal selection still took place in liaison with local primary schools.

In 1988, Latymer took advantage of the Education Reform Act 1988 to become a Grant-Maintained school with selective entrance exams once more. Grant-maintained status was abolished by the School Standards and Framework Act 1998 and Latymer reverted to voluntary aided status.

Houses 
The school has six houses in each year group. The house with the most points each year wins the Dormer Shield, with the runner up winning the Jones Cup.

Each house has a housemaster and/or housemistress.

Ashworth 
Ashworth house is named after the former headmaster, Richard Ashworth. The school was moved to its current site on Haselbury Road when Ashworth was in post. This house is currently represented by a sky blue colour.

Dolbé 
Dolbé house is named after the former headmaster, Dr Charles Vincent Dolbé. Its representative colour is dark blue.

Keats 
Keats house is named after the poet, John Keats. Its representative colour is red.

Lamb 
Lamb house is named after the literary essayist, Charles Lamb. Its representative colour is purple.

Latymer 
Latymer house is named after the founder of the school, Edward Latymer. Its representative house colour is green.

Wyatt 
Wyatt house is named after a patron of the school, Ann Wyatt. This house's representative colour is yellow.

School site 

Much of the north end of the school (principally the Small Hall and surrounding rooms) was built in 1910 after the Old Latymer Schoolhouse (Built mainly by Ann Wyatt and extended in the time of Charles Dolbé) in Church Street was abandoned. The buildings on the present site were provided by Middlesex County Council at a cost of £6,782, and accommodated 150 pupils. Twelve classrooms built in 1924 in the North Block allowed pupil capacity to triple.

The Great Hall, science laboratories and South Block were opened in a ceremony in 1928 by the Duke and Duchess of York. Fully equipped with stage and seating for over 1,000 people, the hall is used for school assemblies, concerts, drama productions and other major events. It is home to the Davis organ, which was repaired and upgraded in 2005.

The gymnasia, art studios and technology block were opened in 1966 by Queen Elizabeth, the Queen Mother. The 12 science laboratories and 6 technology rooms (including facilities for graphic design, product design, textiles and cookery) were re-equipped and modernised in the late 1990s.

Much of the school was modernised in the time of Dr. Trefor Jones. The balconies were altered in the Great Hall so that the pillars were not so obstructive to the view of the stage and the balustrade removed and replaced with panels of fluted light oak. Dark green tiles adorned the walls below the dado rail in much of the older parts of the school which were removed and the walls refinished.

The Ashworth library holds approximately 20,000 volumes and is run by a chartered librarian. A separate Learning Resources Centre (LRC) contains a further 2,000 reference volumes, a selection of periodicals, and computing facilities.

The sixth form common room was converted in 2000 from the Jones Lecture Theatre, which had itself been converted from a gymnasium to mark the retirement of Dr. Jones as Headmaster in 1970. The sixth form study area was built as the common room in 1984 to mark the retirement of headteacher Edward Kelly. Upon the conversion of the Jones Lecture Theatre to the common room, the 1984 building was made into a space for the sixth form to study in their free periods and a connecting building was built between the two, housing offices for the Head of the Sixth Form and a servery for sixth form students.

The 'Mills Building' (named after the former head Geoffrey Mills), a performing arts complex, was opened in the spring of 2000 to service the Music, Drama and Media Studies departments.

The school owns a residential outdoor pursuits centre in Snowdonia National Park, Wales. The centre, Ysgol Latymer, was established on the site of an old primary school situated in the small village of Cwm Penmachno (5 miles from Betws-y-Coed) in 1966, as a 'school away from school'. Since, the school has developed it into a residential centre, accommodating up to forty staff and pupils. It acts as a base of operations for week-long trips in the first year.

The school owns  of playing fields laid out for football, hockey, rugby union, cricket, rounders and athletics according to season.

A new Sports and Dining Complex was opened in a ceremony by Princess Anne on 18 May 2006. The facility is a brownfield development, occupying only slightly more area than the previous catering facility from the 1940s. Various environmentally friendly measures are incorporated into its design, including solar panels providing hot water, sun pipes reducing the need for artificial lighting and wind catchers to provide ventilation.

In February 2010, a new multi-purpose suite entitled the "Seward Studio" replaced the old boys' gym. The studio was officially opened on Tuesday 23 February 2010 by Dame Margaret Seward.

OFSTED report 
The school underwent its most recent OFSTED inspection on 24 March 2022, when it received an overall grade of 'Good', after having previously been graded 'Outstanding' on 25 January 2008.

League table results 
The school received the accolade of 'State Secondary School of the Year' in 'Parent Power', published by The Sunday Times newspaper in 2009. In that same year, 91.9% of GCSE examinations achieved grades A and A*, and 76.4% of entries gained A-grades at A-level (more than any other state school), while 93% obtained A or B grades. Approximately thirty to forty pupils gain places at Oxbridge each year.

In 2019, Latymer was listed in 'Parent Power' as the top co-educational state school in London and fifth co-educational state secondary school in the UK

Notable former pupils 

In entertainment
Evelyn Ankers, actress, known as "the Queen of the B movies"
Clare-Hope Ashitey, actress
Eileen Atkins, actress
Ritchie Coster, actor
Bruce Forsyth, entertainer
Vivian Oparah, actress, "Tanya" in Class, spin-off of Doctor Who
Tim Pope, director
Mike Scott, television producer and presenter
Leslie Welch, radio and television personality, the Memory Man
Aubrey Woods, actor, best known for performing "The Candy Man" in the 1971 film Willy Wonka and the Chocolate Factory

In politics
Syed Kamall, Conservative MEP
Albert Meltzer, anarcho-communist writer
Ash Sarkar, British journalist and left-wing political activist
David Walder, Conservative Party politician
In academia
Mark Abrams, social scientist
John Horlock, vice–chancellor, Open University, 1981–90
John Prebble, historian and novelist
Stephen Wheatcroft, economist and civil aviation expert influential in founding of British Airways
Yorick Wilks, artificial intelligence pioneer

In sport
Ted Blake, trampoline pioneer
Johnny Haynes, former Fulham F.C. and England football captain
Arthur Sanders, footballer
Leslie Medley, former Spurs and England footballer.
Mark Warburton, manager of Queens Park Rangers
Timothy Shuttleworth, competed for Team GB in Rio Olympics 2016

In music
Richard Cook, music writer, former executive of PolyGram records
B.J. Wilson, original drummer of Procol Harum
Grace Chatto, cellist in British electronic music band Clean Bandit.
James Blake, British electronic artist.
Debbie Smith, guitarist in Curve and Echobelly.
Simone Butler, bass player with Primal Scream.
Ken Sykora, jazz guitarist and radio presenter, BBC Radio, BBC Radio Scotland, Radio Clyde.

Other
Shaw Clifton, general of The Salvation Army
Nick Holtam, 78th bishop of Salisbury
Philip John North, bishop of Burnley
William Rolls, flying ace of the Second World War

References

External links 

Official website
A summary of Latymer's academic performance
A detailed history of the Latymer schools at British History Online
Profile at the Good Schools Guide

Educational institutions established in the 1620s
Grammar schools in the London Borough of Enfield
1624 establishments in England
Voluntary aided schools in London
Edmonton, London